Sacred Heart Matriculation Higher Secondary School (SHMHSS) is a matriculation institution in the town of Kayyunni, Gudalur, Nilgiris - Tamil Nadu. The school is a christian missionary educational institution ran by Fathima Matha Trust along with Nilgiri Educational Trust.

History 
The school was founded in 1985, by Fathima Matha Trust for the purpose of providing education for the rural areas of Gudalur. Since its inception the school has grown rapidly providing Kindergarten to Class XII from the Matriculation Board as well as State Education Board of Tamil Nadu.

Location 
The school is located at the town of Kayyunni in the western ghats region of Nilgiris, Tamil Nadu providing a scenic and natural learning atmosphere.  Being in the western parts of Nilgiris, the school shares its visibility to nearby states of Kerala and Karnataka.

Education 
Since the school is run by a christian missionary, the majority of staffs are from priests and nuns from the Fathima Matha church. Even though the institution is run by christian missionary the school encourages no partiality in the admission for children from other castes and creeds.

The medium of instruction is English and has optional secondary languages to choose from Tamil, Malayalam or Hindi.

List Of Principals
As of 2019

Facilities

Sports

 Courts Available 
Football
Throwball
Basketball
Badminton
Tennikoit
Table Tennis

Other Available Games
Cricket
Handball
Chess
Kabbadi
Volleyball

Education

The higher secondary section have 5 different streams:
Mathematics with Computer Science
Mathematics with Biology
Pure Science
Commerce with Computer Applications
Biology with Computer Science

Till 10th, All the students have to study Tamil as their first language. The higher secondary students can choose Tamil, Malayalam or Hindi as their first language. Besides these the students are also taught General Knowledge (GK) and Moral Science as subjects. All Students are allowed to speak English throughout the school campus. And Special training for students are also given for languages.

Available Facilities
Digital Smart Class
Computer Laboratory
Physics Laboratory
Chemistry Laboratory
Biology Laboratory
Library

Co-curricular Activities
Students are also taught additional co curricular activities along with subjects

Available Co-curricular Classes
Gym
Karate
Yoga
Music
Dance
Arts and crafts

Awards 
By providing better learning environment, the school had earned high rankings at the district and state levels.

References 

Christian schools in Tamil Nadu
Primary schools in Tamil Nadu
High schools and secondary schools in Tamil Nadu
Schools in Nilgiris district
Educational institutions established in 1985
1985 establishments in Tamil Nadu